The Giro di Puglia  was a road bicycle racing stage race. It consisted of three or four stages. It was first held in 1972, but last took place in 1998.

Cycle races in Italy
Recurring sporting events established in 1972
1972 establishments in Italy
Recurring sporting events disestablished in 1998
Men's road bicycle races
Defunct cycling races in Italy
1998 disestablishments in Italy